The 2018 Deutschland Tour was a road cycling stage race that took place between 23 and 26 August 2018. After a 10 year break, the Deutschland Tour held its 33rd edition and was rated as a 2.1 event as part of the 2018 UCI Europe Tour.

Teams
The 22 teams invited to the race were:

Route
The route of the 2018 Deutschland Tour ran through southwestern Germany, crossing the states of Rhineland-Palatinate, North Rhine-Westphalia, Baden-Württemberg, Saarland and Hesse, and covered more than 737 kilometers. Due to the hilly terrain, the course was mainly suited for sprinters and aggressive classics riders.

Stages

Stage 1
23 August 2018 — Koblenz to Bonn,

Stage 2
24 August 2018 — Bonn to Trier,

Stage 3
25 August 2018 — Trier to Merzig,

Stage 4
26 August 2018 — Lorsch to Stuttgart,

Classification leadership
In the 2018 Deutschland Tour, four jerseys were awarded. The general classification was calculated by adding each cyclist's finishing times on each stage. Time bonuses were awarded to the first three finishers on all stages: the stage winner won a ten-second bonus, with six and four seconds for the second and third riders respectively. Bonus seconds were also awarded to the first three riders at intermediate sprints – three seconds for the winner of the sprint, two seconds for the rider in second and one second for the rider in third. The leader of the general classification received a red engraved jersey with the names of more than 1.500 supporters who participated in the route creation. This classification was considered the most important of the 2018 Deutschland Tour, and the winner of the classification was considered the winner of the race.

The second classification was the points classification. Riders were awarded points for finishing in the top ten in a stage. Points were also won in intermediate sprints; five points for crossing the sprint line first, three points for second place, and one for third. The leader of the points classification was awarded a green jersey sponsored by Škoda.

There was also a mountains classification, for which points were awarded for reaching the top of a climb before other riders. In each climb the top three riders earned points; three points for crossing the summit line first, two points for the second placed rider and a single point for the third. The leadership of the mountains classification was marked by a black jersey with white polka-dots.

The fourth jersey represented the young rider classification, marked by a white and dotted jersey sponsored by Dauner. Only riders born after 1 January 1993 were eligible; the young rider best placed in the general classification was the leader of the young rider classification. There was also a classification for teams, in which the times of the best three cyclists in a team on each stage were added together; the leading team at the end of the race was the team with the lowest cumulative time.

Final standings

General classification

Points classification

Mountains classification

Young rider classification

Team classification

References

External links

2018 Deutschland Tour
Deutschland Tour
Deutschland Tour
Deutschland Tour